is a semimonthly seinen manga magazine published since July 1, 1987 by Shogakukan in Japan. Its target audience is somewhere between the audience for Big Comic Original and Big Comic Spirits. The magazine has published works by a number of well-known manga artists, including Ryoichi Ikegami, Mochiru Hoshisato, Yū Koyama, Yūji Aoki, Fumi Saimon, Norifusa Mita, George Akiyama, and Buronson.

Superior was originally a special issue of Big Comic Original, published twice monthly on the 1st and 15th. However, since it was selling just as well as the main three magazines (Big Comic, Big Comic Original, and Big Comic Spirits), it began to be released every other week. It is currently released twice monthly on the second and fourth Fridays. As of 2015, Superior has a reported circulation of 115,334 for each issue.

Series

Currently running series

Past series 
Aibō by Tamayo Koyasu
Aji Ichi Monme by Yoshimi Kurata, Yoshita Abe, and Yukie Fukuda
Ankō: Kaizuri Kaijō Sōsasen, written by Masaki Kitahara and illustrated by Hideki Akiyama with assistance from Fishing Graph
Azumi by Yū Koyama
Bow by Terry Yamamoto
Chūshun Komawari-kun by Tatsuhiko Yamagami
Hannari! by Fumi Saimon
Gigant by Hiroya Oku 
Higake Kin'yūden Komanezumi Shussemichi, written by Toichi Akizuki and illustrated by Kōji Yoshimoto with supervision from Yūji Aoki
Kiichi!! by Hideki Arai
Lord, written by Buronson and illustrated by Ryoichi Ikegami
Maihime: Diva, written by Ryō Kurashina and illustrated by Tomoya Ōishi
Money no Ken by Norifusa Mita
Mobile Suit Gundam Thunderbolt by Yasuo Ohtagaki (ongoing)
Moonlight Mile by Yasuo Ōtagaki 
Ojuken no Hoshi, story by Mayu Sugiura, illustrated by Kenjū Imatani and created by Nozomi Hashira
Okuribito by Akira Sasō
Radio Jikan by Radio Wada
Rāmen Hakkenden, written by Rokurō Kube and illustrated by Tan Kawai
Reiraku by Inio Asano
Sekai no Chūshin de Kuda o Maku by Inosuke Rodriguez
Shakaijin Misaki Satoru by Yasuyuki Kunitomo
Sprite by Yūgo Ishikawa
Team Medical Dragon, written by Akira Nagai and illustrated by Tarō Nogizaka

References

External links
 

1987 establishments in Japan
Semimonthly manga magazines published in Japan
Magazines established in 1987
Seinen manga magazines
Shogakukan magazines
Magazines published in Tokyo